Ardisia sonchifolia is a species of plant in the family Primulaceae. It is endemic to India.

References

sonchifolia
Flora of Kerala
Endangered plants
Taxonomy articles created by Polbot